Xavier Darcos (born 14 July 1947) is a French politician, scholar, civil servant and former Minister of Labour.

An agrégé professor in literature and general inspector of the National Education system, he has been Mayor of Périgueux, a Senator, and a minister in Jean-Pierre Raffarin and François Fillon's governments.

Biography
Darcos was born on 14 July 1947 in Limoges to Jean-Gabriel Darcos and Anne-Marie Banvillet.

After getting a PhD in Latin studies from the University of Bordeaux under the direction of Jean-Pierre Néraudau and becoming a professor emeritus in letters and social sciences, he started teaching in 1968, first in Périgueux, then in a Bordeaux khâgne from 1982 to 1987, and finally at the Lycée Louis-le-Grand, Paris from 1987 to 1992.

In 1989 he became deputy to the Mayor of Périgueux. Three years later, he became a senior school inspector.

From 1993 to 1995 he was the chief of staff (directeur de cabinet) to Education Minister François Bayrou, from 1995 to 1997 advisor to Prime Minister Alain Juppé for education and culture matters, and from 1995 to 1998, along with François Bayroux and Claude Allègre, he was the president of school inspectors. From 1996 to 1999 he was also a Professor in comparative literature at the Paris IV University.

In 1997 he became Mayor of Périgueux, and was reelected both in 2001 and 2005. He was also elected Senator of Dordogne in 1998.

In May 2002, he became Minister for School Education in Jean-Pierre Raffarin's cabinet, then on 1 April 2004 Minister for Cooperation, Development and Francophony.

He has been a member of the Aquitaine Regional Council since 2004. On 15 June 2005 he became a French ambassador for the OCDE.

In 2006, he was elected as member of the Académie des sciences morales et politiques and was its secrétaire perpétuel  from 2010 until 2017.

Since 18 May 2007, he has been the Minister of National Education in François Fillon's governments. In March 2008, he failed to be reelected as Mayor of Périgueux.

In 2009, he condemned as "criminal" statements made by Pope Benedict XVI which claimed that condoms promote AIDS, when in fact they help protect against it.

Darcos was elected as an immortel of the Académie Française on 13 June 2013.

Political career
Governmental functions
Minister of Labor, Social Affairs, Family, and Solidarity : 2009–2010.
Minister of National Education : 2007–2009.
Minister of School Education : 2002–2004.
Minister of Development, Cooperation and Francophony : 2004–2005.

Electoral mandates

Senate of France

Senator of Dordogne : 1998–2002 (Became minister in 2002).

Regional Council

Regional councillor of Aquitaine : Since 2004. Reelected in 2010.

Municipal Council
Mayor of Périgueux : 1997–2002 (Resignation) / 2005–2008. Reelected in 2001, 2005.
Deputy-mayor of Périgueux : 1989–1997 / 2002–2005. Reelected in 1995.
Municipal councillor of Périgueux : 1989–2008. Reelected in 1995, 2001.

Agglomeration community Council
President of the Agglomeration community of Périgueux : 2000–2001.
Member of the Agglomeration community of Périgueux : 2000–2001.

Awards and honours
 Xavier Darcos entered the Academy of Moral and Political Sciences in 2006, and the French Academy in 2013. He is also a commander of the Légion d'Honneur, Officer of the National Order of Merit, Commander of the Academic palm and Commander of the Art and letter decoration.

Bibliography
 Histoire de la littérature française, 1992
 Approches ovidiennes de la mort, 1995
 Mérimée, 1998
 Robert des grands écrivains de langue française, (with other writers)
 L'Art d'apprendre à ignorer, 2000
 Dictionnaire des mythes féminins, 2002 (with other writers)
 Lettre à tous ceux qui aiment l'école, 2003 (en coll.)
 Deux voix pour une école, 2004 (with other writers)
 L'École de Jules Ferry, 2005 ( in 2006)
 L'État et les Églises, 1905–2005, 2005
 L'État et les Églises, la question laïque, 2006
 Tacite, ses vérités sont les nôtres, 2007
 Bruno Neveu (1936–2004), Institut de France, 2007
 La escuela republicana en Francia, Prensas universitarias de Zaragoza, 2008
 René Haby par lui-même, en coll., INRP, 2009,
 L'école forme-t-elle encore des citoyens ?, avec Aurélie Filippetti, Frémeaux & Associés, 2008
 Peut-on améliorer l'école sans dépenser plus ?, avec Vincent Peillon, Magnard, 2009
 Ovide et la mort, PUF, Coll. « Hors collection », 2009
 Une anthologie historique de la poésie française, PUF, coll. « Hors collection », 2010
 Dictionnaire amoureux de la Rome antique, Plon, 2011
 La Poésie française, Eyrolles, coll. « Mes passions », 2012
 Histoire de la littérature française, Hachette, 2013
 Oscar a toujours raison, Plon, 2013
 Auguste et son siècle, Artlys, 2014,
 Jean-Pierre Angrémy, dit Pierre-Jean Remy, Institut de France, 2015
 Dictionnaire amoureux de l'Ecole, Plon, 2016,
 Virgile, notre vigie, Fayard, 2017,

References

External links

Biography 
Official blog 

1947 births
Living people
People from Limoges
French civil servants
Politicians of the French Fifth Republic
Members of the Académie des sciences morales et politiques
French Ministers of National Education
Commandeurs of the Légion d'honneur
Officers of the Ordre national du Mérite
Members of the Académie Française
University of Bordeaux alumni
Commandeurs of the Ordre des Arts et des Lettres
French Senators of the Fifth Republic
Senators of Dordogne
Politicians from Nouvelle-Aquitaine
Union for a Popular Movement politicians